The 1999–2000 season was the 61st season in the existence of UE Lleida and the club's sixth consecutive season in the second division of Spanish football.

Competitions

Overall record

Segunda División

League table

Results summary

Results by round

Matches

Source:

Copa del Rey

First round

Second round

Round of 16

References

UE Lleida seasons
Lleida